Brian Murphy (born August 20, 1947) is a Canadian retired  professional ice hockey centre who played in one National Hockey League game for the Detroit Red Wings during the 1974–75 season on November 28, 1974 against the Buffalo Sabres. The rest of his career, which lasted from 1968 to 1978, was spent in various minor leagues.

Career statistics

Regular season and playoffs

See also
 List of players who played only one game in the NHL

External links
 

1947 births
Living people
Baltimore Clippers players
Canadian ice hockey centres
Detroit Red Wings players
London Nationals players
Ontario Hockey Association Senior A League (1890–1979) players
Rochester Americans players
Ice hockey people from Toronto
Springfield Kings players
Toronto Marlboros players
Virginia Wings players